Angry Birds Island was a free-to-play tile-matching puzzle video game that was soft-launched in select countries and regions on February 1, 2018 and was slated for wide release in 2019 but was cancelled on June 26, 2019  to focus on the Chinese release.  The game was a direct sequel to the original Angry Birds Blast! released in December 2016. The game was developed by MYBO Games and was published by Rovio Entertainment.

History
The game has since been in soft launch in select regions and territories such as some Asian countries since early February 2018. The game was discontinued on June 26, 2019  to focus on the Chinese release.

Gameplay
Angry Birds Island is a match-three game with gameplay similar to the original Angry Birds Blast released in December 2016. There are varying puzzle levels that the player has to play through in order to continue fixing up existing objects on or adding new objects to a large 3-D HUB-like game world in which the player unlocks more and more of the areas that were previously restricted or closed off. The way the player does this is by playing through levels in order to obtain stars to complete various tasks. To obtain stars, the player must complete the level and achieve a high enough score to earn them whether it be 1, 2, or 3 stars depending on the objective(s), the level, the amount of taps, or moves, the player has left, and the player's score. 

The game, as of soft launch, has 345 total levels with more levels more than likely being added on during development and in the future for events and holidays but the game was cancelled in Summer 2019.

References

Cancelled Android (operating system) games
Angry Birds video games
Cancelled iOS games
2018 video games
Video games developed in China
Products and services discontinued in 2019